The Miners' National Union (MNU) was a trade union which represented miners in Great Britain.

History
The union was founded in November 1863 at a five-day long conference at the People's Hall in Leeds.  It was originally known as the National Association of Coal, Lime and Ironstone Miners of Great Britain or Miners' National Association.  It campaigned for legislation in the interests of its members, but did not involve itself in trade disputes, and disappointed strikers who hoped it would provide them with financial support.  Its most prominent achievement was in getting the Coal Mines Regulation Act 1872 passed; this required payment of miners by weight and restricted working hours for children in the mines.

The Amalgamated Association of Miners was formed by former members of the union in 1869 and for a few years established new unions across the country.  However, by 1875 it was in financial trouble and the two negotiated a merger; however, Macdonald ultimately only changed the name to the "Miners' National Union" and advised former members of the Amalgamated Association to join.

Trade unions affiliated to the union included the Derbyshire and Nottinghamshire Miners' Association, Durham Miners' Association, Northumberland Miners' Association, South Yorkshire Miners' Association and West Yorkshire Miners' Association.  The union also worked closely with the Scottish Miners' Association, whose secretary was Alexander Macdonald, President of the MNU.

The union's affiliates in 1873 were:

By 1889, in addition to Northumberland and Durham, the newer Yorkshire Miners' Association, Derbyshire Miners' Association, Nottinghamshire Miners' Association, Ashton-under-Lyne Miners' Association and Monmouthshire and South Wales Miners' Association held membership.  At that year's conference, the unions voted against involving itself with wage disputes, instead focusing on lobbying Parliament for reforms.  However, it had no objection to the creation of a new organisation being created to intervene on industrial matters and, as a result, several affiliates were founder members of the Miners' Federation of Great Britain, the MNU then fading in importance.

In 1898, the Durham Miners and a few remaining minor bodies withdrew from the union; with only the Northumberland Miners still affiliated, the MNU was dissolved.

Presidents
1863: Alexander Macdonald
1881: Thomas Burt

Secretaries
1863: Richard Mitchell
1865: John Worrall
Philip Casey
1875: Thomas Halliday
1877: William Crawford
1890: John Wilson

References

Defunct trade unions of the United Kingdom
Mining trade unions
1863 establishments in England
Trade unions established in 1863
1898 disestablishments
Trade unions disestablished in the 1890s